Arthur Frederick Watts CMG (26 May 1897 – 8 June 1970) was an Australian politician who served in the Western Australian Legislative Assembly from 1935 to 1962, including as leader of the opposition (from 1942 to 1947) and deputy premier (from 1947 to 1953 and 1959 to 1962) of Western Australia.

Born in London, Watts emigrated to Perth with his family in 1906, later moving to Katanning. Having boarded at Guildford Grammar School, he was admitted to the Supreme Court of Western Australia in 1920 as a barrister and solicitor. Watts was elected to parliament for the Country Party at a 1935 by-election, necessitated by the death of Arnold Piesse. He succeeded Charles Latham as leader of the Country Party and leader of the opposition in 1942, and was made deputy premier to Ross McLarty following the 1947 state election. 

Despite being Opposition leader, Watts did not become Premier with the change of government at the 1947 election as his party the Country Party won one less seat than its Coalition partner the Liberals resulting in Liberal leader McLarty becoming Premier instead.

It is one instance of an Opposition Leader who did not become Premier with an election producing a change of government.

The government was defeated at the 1953 election, but was re-elected at the six years, with Watts again serving as deputy premier under David Brand. He resigned as deputy premier in February 1962, and did not contest the state election the following month, having been appointed chairman of the State Licensing Courts. Watts died in Perth in June 1970.

Notes

References

1897 births
1970 deaths
Australian Anglicans
Australian barristers
Australian solicitors
Burials at Karrakatta Cemetery
Deputy Premiers of Western Australia
English emigrants to Australia
Leaders of the Opposition in Western Australia
Members of the Western Australian Legislative Assembly
People educated at Guildford Grammar School
People from Katanning, Western Australia
National Party of Australia members of the Parliament of Western Australia
20th-century Australian politicians
Energy Ministers of Western Australia